Vitaly Medvedev may refer to:
Vitaly Medvedev (sprinter) (born 1977), Olympic sprint runner from Kazakhstan
Vitaly Medvedev (fencer) (born 1983), Ukrainian Olympic fencer